A blind pig is a type of speakeasy.

Blind pig may also refer to:

Blind Pig (venue), a music venue in Ann Arbor, Michigan, US
Blind Pig Records, San Francisco, US blues record label
 Blind Pig, whiskey- and rum-flavoured ciders by HP Bulmer
Blind Pig Brewing Company, a branding of the Russian River Brewing Company
Blind Pigs, former name of the Brazilian band Porcos Cegos
The Blind Pig (restaurant), a restaurant speakeasy in Dublin Ireland

See also
Blind Pig Who Wants to Fly, a 2008 film directed by Edwin